Rude Records is an independent and international record label founded in 2000 and based in Milan, Italy. The label's artists are generally considered to fall under the genres of punk rock, pop punk, post-hardcore, and alternative rock. Over the years the company has signed agreements with various record labels, especially from the US, to handle promotion, marketing, and distribution of their releases in Europe. It has published over 150 albums by more than 60 artists.

Name
The name Rude Records takes inspiration from "rude boys", ska fans: when was the time to decide the label's name Gianluca Amendolara was producing an album by Franziska, a band that followed that genre.

History

Rude was founded in 2000 by Ilich Rausa and Gianluca Amendolara, in order to publish two bands of friends (Kevlar HC and No Comply). 

The success came in 2001, when a song by Sun Eats Hours was included in a Rock Sound compilation and they were contacted to support the Offspring on tour.

In 2005, a collaboration with Nitro Records (label owned by the singer Dexter Holland) was established and, in the following year, a new deal was signed with Side One Dummy Records to promote their catalog in Southern Europe. Agreements with Punk Core, Bad Taste Records and Hopeless Records followed.
In 2007, Rude Records licensed the back catalogue of Gogol Bordello from Rubric Records for the world outside the US. The following year they released a documentary movie of Gogol Bordello, in Europe, titled The Pied Piper of Hutzovina.
In 2011, Zebrahead joined the Rude roster, with their album "Get Nice!", and were followed by Bedouin Soundclash, Less Than Jake and The Mighty Mighty Bosstones by the end of the year.
In 2013, the label expanded its network into South East Asia, Japan, Australia, and New Zealand.

Over the years it has developed an international network with teams in North America, the UK, Asia, Japan, Australia and Europe which further increases the label's global presence. Rude Records in recent years has signed many young artists that it has launched internationally such as Stand Atlantic, Blood Youth, Homebound, Sundressed and many others. From 2020 Rude Records signed a worldwide agreement with Sony Music for digital and physical distribution operated by The Orchard and a deal with Sony ATV America for the management of publishing.

In March 2022 Rude Records gained the B Corp certification.

Artists

All Get Out
American Hi-Fi
Armor for Sleep
As Cities Burn
A Will Away
Bars of Gold
Blood Youth
Calling All Captains
Catch Fire
The Dangerous Summer
Decade
Gideon
Graphic Nature
Guttermouth
Hail the Sun
Happy.
The Juliana Theory
William Ryan Key
Light Years
Mobs
Modern Error
Never Loved
Nova Charisma
Polyphia
Puppy
Saves the Day
Sydney Sprague
Sundressed
Sunsleeper
Superlove
Telltale
The End of the Ocean
Vagrants
Waxflower
Weatherstate
Young Culture

Former

7 Minutes In Heaven
Adam Carpet
Andead
Andrea Rock
Airway
Banda Bassotti
Bedouin Soundclash
Blessed By A Broken Heart 
Blondelle
Boy Jumps Ship
Brent Walsh
Capsize
Crooked Teeth
Danko Jones
Destine 
Elvis Jackson
Emery
Franziska
Gasnervino
Gogol Bordello 
Homebound
I Am The Avalanche
I the Mighty
Junior 
Kevlar HC
Knuckle Puck 
Less Than Jake
Like Torches
Man Overboard
Nemesi
No Comply
Patent Pending
Rentokill
Set It Off
Sleep On It
Stand Atlantic
Steam
Summerlin
Sun Eats Hours
The Dear Hunter
The Maine
The Mighty Mighty Bosstones
The Weekend Classic
This Century 
Useless ID
Woes
Youth Killed It
Zebrahead

Representation

Labels represented
Bad Taste Records (2008-2012)
Hassle Records (from 2009)
Hopeless Records (from 2006)
Nitro Records (2005-2013)
Punkcore Records 
Rubric Records (from 2007)
SideOneDummy (from 2006)
Wynona Records (from 2009)

Bands represented

A Wilhelm Scream
AFI (active with Republic Records)
Against All Authority
Air Dubai 
All Time Low
Amber Pacific (active with Victory Records)
Anarbor
Anti-Flag (active with Spinefarm Records)
The Aquabats
Attack! Attack! (disbanded)
Avenged Sevenfold (active with Mercury Records)
August Burns Red (active with Fearless Records)
Bayside
Big D and the Kids Table
The Briggs
Broadway Calls
Brothers of Brazil
Cancer Bats
The Casualties
Chuck Ragan
Crime in Stereo
The Damned
The Dangerous Summer (disbanded)
Dillinger Four (active with Fat Wreck Chords)
Divided By Friday
Driver Friendly
Ensign
Fact
Flogging Molly
The Gaslight Anthem (active with Mercury Records)
The Get Up Kids
Goldfinger
The Horrible Crowes
The Offspring (active with Columbia Records)
Reverend Peyton's Big Damn Band
Rufio
Samiam
Senses Fail (active with Pure Noise Records)
Silverstein (active with Rise Records)
Son of Sam
T.S.O.L.
Taking Back Sunday
Title Fight
There For Tomorrow
Thrice (active with Vagrant Records
The Sounds
The Queers (active with Asian Man Records)
The Used 
The Vandals
Turbowolf
We Are the In Crowd
We Are the Ocean
The Wonder Years
Yellowcard
65daysofstatic
7 Seconds
88 Fingers Louie (disbanded)

Compilation 
 2001 – Stay Rude, Stay Rebel
 2002 – Mad for Ska
 2003 – Punk It!
 2003 – Anti-Tour - The Combat Compilation
 2004 – Punk It! Vol.2
 2007 – Think Punk Vol. 1
 2014 – PGA - Italian Punks Go Acoustic: Stay Together For The Kids
 2016 – Music for Boobies
 2016 – PGA - Italian Punks Go Acoustic: If the Kids Are United
 2020 – It'd Be Rude Not To

See also
List of record labels

References

External links

Record labels established in 2000
Italian independent record labels
Alternative rock record labels
Hardcore record labels
Punk record labels
Post-hardcore record labels
2000 establishments in Italy
B Lab-certified corporations